Tagiades menaka, commonly known as the spotted snow flat or the dark-edged snow flat, is a species of spread-winged skipper butterflies. It contains three subspecies.

Tagiades menaka manis 
Found in the Himalayas from Kashmir to Assam, and Burma
Tagiades menaka mantra Evans, 1934
Found in the northwest Himalayas, Burma, Thailand, Laos, northern Vietnam, and Hainan, southern China
Tagiades menaka menaka Evans, 1934

T. m. vajuna from Kanara, India has been transferred to the species Tagiades litigiosa. T. m. var. formosana and T. m. var. cohaerens of southern China and Taiwan, has been reclassified as Tagiades cohaerens.

References

Tagiades
Butterflies described in 1867
Butterflies of Indochina
Taxa named by Frederic Moore